The women's 200 metres event  at the 2000 European Athletics Indoor Championships was held on February 25–26.

Medalists

Results

Heats
First 2 of each heat (Q) and the next 5 fastest (q) qualified for the semifinals.

Semifinals
First 2 of each semifinals qualified directly (Q) for the final.

Final

References
Results

200 metres at the European Athletics Indoor Championships
2000 European Athletics Indoor Championships
2000 in women's athletics